Raumar Jude (born 1929- April 16, 2009 in Montevideo) was a Uruguayan political figure.

Background

He was a member of the Uruguayan Colorado Party. His father was former Justice Minister and Interior Minister Raúl Jude.

Political offices

He was elected as a Deputy in the 1950s and 1960s.

He subsequently served as a Senator in the 1970s, 1980s and 1990s.

See also

 Politics of Uruguay
 Political Families of Uruguay

References
 :es:Raumar Jude

1929 births
2009 deaths
Colorado Party (Uruguay) politicians
Members of the Chamber of Representatives of Uruguay
Members of the Senate of Uruguay